Inaki Basauri (born 1 October 1984 in Monterrey, Mexico) is a Mexico-born former American rugby union player who  played most of his career in the Pro D2.

Career

Early career
Basauri first started playing rugby when he was 15 and was invited to a practice by his friend. Inaki graduated from Walt Whitman High School in 2002. Throughout High School, he played sevens rugby with the Maryland Exiles in the summer and varsity football in the fall. He played for the U-19 National Team at age 16 and vice-captained the USA U-19 Tour to France for the World Championships. After the France U-19 World Championships, he was recruited by Massy to play for their U-21 Team.

Professional career
At 23, he played professionally for SU Agen in France and was the youngest starter of the team. He also played in Italy for the L'Aquila Rugby club in the Super 10 competition. Having previously played in France with CA Lannemezan, SU Agen and CA Perigueux. Basauri returned with Tarbes in the Pro D2 where he made 47 appearances over three years. In July 2015 Basauri signed a contract with Stade Nantais of the Fédérale 2. Basauri was also a member of the USA 2007 Rugby World Cup and 2011 Rugby World Cup squads.

References

External links
 

1984 births
Living people
American rugby union players
American sportspeople of Mexican descent
Mexican emigrants to the United States
United States international rugby union players
American expatriate rugby union players
Expatriate rugby union players in Italy
Expatriate rugby union players in France
American expatriate sportspeople in France
American expatriate sportspeople in Italy
Mexican rugby union players
American people of Basque descent
Mexican people of Basque descent
Walt Whitman High School (Maryland) alumni